Skiddaw Little Man also called Little Man is a fell in the English Lake District, it is situated four kilometres north of the town of Keswick and reaches a height of 865 m (2,837 ft).

Topography
Little Man is often overlooked and disregarded as an independent and distinct fell due to its name which makes it sound like a minor top of its parent fell Skiddaw which in fact lies 1.5 kilometres to the north west. With a topographical prominence of 61 metres, Little Man qualifies comfortably as a Hewitt and Nuttall hill and is regarded as a separate fell by renowned mountain writers Alfred Wainwright and Bill Birkett. The fell is actually called Little Man on Ordnance Survey maps and by many guide books.

To the north and east Little Man is connected to the Skiddaw massif, Lonscale Fell being the nearest separate fell to the east, 2.5 kilometres away. To the south and the west the fell falls away steeply with fast flowing streams draining the fell into the River Derwent. Half a kilometre to the south east of the main summit lies a lower top called Lesser Man (815 metres), this is adorned with an unusual cairn consisting of rocks and old fence posts. A further half a kilometre to the south east of Lesser Man, on the other side of the bridleway from Keswick to Skiddaw, stands Jenkin Hill (735 metres), this flat-topped height being regarded as an outlier of Little Man.

Geology
Geologically, Little Man consists of Skiddaw slate and the summit of the fell is made up of grassy patches within large areas of slate.

Summit
Little Man has one big advantage over Skiddaw in that its convex southern slopes make it a far better viewpoint than its higher neighbour. In fact the panorama from Little Man is regarded as one of the best in the national park taking in the valleys and lakes of northern Lakeland as well as all of the best-known fells of the district.

Ascents
Many people climb Little Man via the tourist path from Keswick on the way to the summit of Skiddaw. However, there are several better and more interesting but steep ascents from the hamlets of Millbeck and Applethwaite to the south of the fell. One of the routes from Millbeck is a scrambler's route up the steep south west Arête.

Gallery

References
 A Pictorial Guide to the Lakeland Fells, The Northern Fells, Alfred Wainwright 
 Complete Lakeland Fells, Bill Birkett, 
 The Mountains of England and Wales, John and Anne Nuttall 

Hewitts of England
Fells of the Lake District
Nuttalls